The NP-18 is a Norinco copy of the Hungarian made pistol FEG P9R. Like the FEG P9R, it combines the design and operation of the Browning Hi-Power with the trigger mechanism of the Smith & Wesson double action trigger.

Design
The Norinco NP-18 is a Chinese copy of the FEG P9R. The handgun uses the 9×19mm Parabellum round, which is common in this type of guns. It has a heavy duty forged (not cast) steel frame and slide, which makes it one of the most solid, robust self-loading pistols that are actually in the market, because, unlike  cast steel, forged steel is made with strength and toughness in mind.

It has a chrome-lined barrel to extend the barrel life, make it easier to clean, and better protect it from corrosion and erosion than a non-chromed barrel. Because it's a handgun, one doesn't need to worry about the little difference of accuracy between a chromed and a non-chromed barrel (which has better accuracy).

The gun has a slide-mounted safety/decocker, which makes it slightly more safe than other types of safeties or decockers, because, when the safety is engaged, it also decocks the hammer, preventing accidental shots. 

As an inspiration of Smith & Wesson, the NP-18 has a double-action trigger. With this system, the gun can be fired with the hammer cocked or decocked.

The gun has a ten-round double column magazine, similar to that of the Browning Hi-Power, which was one of the first guns to adopt the double column magazine.

The gun frame has a blue finished steel and a plastic grip that can easily be replaced by taking out a couple of screws.

References

9mm Parabellum semi-automatic pistols
Semi-automatic pistols of the People's Republic of China
Norinco